Matthysse is a surname. Notable people with the surname include:

 Edith Soledad Matthysse, Argentine boxer
 Lucas Matthysse (born 1982), Argentine boxer, brother of Walter
 Walter Matthysse (born 1978), Argentine boxer